A Wedding Night at Stjarnehov (Swedish: En bröllopsnatt på Stjärnehov) is a 1934 Swedish comedy film directed by Torsten Lundqvist and starring Adolf Jahr, Elisabeth Frisk and Ruth Stevens. It was shot at the Kungsholmen Studios of Nordisk Tonefilm in Stockholm and on location around Södertälje and Trosa. The film's sets were designed by the art director Bertil Duroj. It is now considered to be a lost film.

Synopsis
In order to save his family estate Bertil Stiernhielm, son of a count, marries Britta Magnusson the daughter of a sausage millionaire. However he has grave doubts about whether this is consistent with his family honour. Meanwhile his twin brother Casimir returns from serving in the Swedish navy and is mistaken by Britta for Bertil.

Cast
 Adolf Jahr as 	Bertil Stiernhielm/Casimir Stiernhielm
 Elisabeth Frisk as 	Britta Magnusson
 Ruth Stevens as 	Marianne
 Olof Sandborg as 	Count Stiernhielm
 Lili Ziedner as Augusta Stiernhielm
 Eric Gustafson as 	Magnusson
 Jullan Jonsson as 	Mrs. Magnusson
 Nils Wahlbom as Jean

References

Bibliography 
 Freiburg, Jeanne Ellen. Regulatory Bodies: Gendered Visions of the State in German and Swedish Cinema. University of Minnesota, 1994.

External links 
 

1934 films
Swedish comedy films
1934 comedy films
1930s Swedish-language films
Swedish black-and-white films
1930s Swedish films